Astrebla Downs is a national park in Shire of Diamantina, Queensland, Australia.

Geography 
Astrebla Downs is located in the Channel Country of outback Queensland, 1298 km west of Brisbane. The landscape is flat and barren with few trees. The average elevation of the terrain is 108 meters.

Animals 
The park received an award in March 2007 by the WWF for being among the top 10 reserves of the decade. Recognition was given for the successful efforts to protect the bilby, an endangered mammal native to Australia. By 2008 it was estimated the park contained a bilby population of around 300. In 2009, a plague of long-haired rats descended on the park. The large numbers of rats attract feral cats to the area, which pose a threat to the bilby. Between 2011 and 2021, control measures have got rid of more than 3,000 cats, and
471 bilbies were spotted on a survey in June 2021.

The park is home to the kowari, a tiny carnivorous marsupial which is a vulnerable species in Queensland, also threatened by feral cats. None have been spotted at the nearby Diamantina National Park since 2012.

Astrebla Downs is also home to the stripe-faced dunnart.

Birds
With Diamantina National Park, Astrebla Downs National Park forms part of the 7,627 km2 Diamantina and Astrebla Grasslands Important Bird Area, identified by BirdLife International as such because it is one of few sites known for the critically endangered night parrot.  It also supports globally important populations of the plains-wanderer, Australian bustard, straw-necked ibis, white-necked heron, inland dotterel, Bourke's parrot, black and pied honeyeaters, gibberbird, Hall's babbler, chestnut-breasted quail-thrush, cinnamon quail-thrush and spinifexbird.

See also

 Davenport Downs Station
 Protected areas of Queensland

References

National parks of Queensland
Protected areas established in 1996
1996 establishments in Australia
Important Bird Areas of Queensland
Shire of Diamantina